The Ignalina Gymnasium is a secondary school in Ignalina, Lithuania. The gymnasium was originally named 'The Ignalina Regional Gymnasium', until 2012 when it became Ignalina Gymnasium. Due to demographic crisis in Lithuania, the number of students has decreased significantly. In 2004 it had 553 students, in 2017 - 286 students.

'

References

External links 
 *  (LT/EN)

Schools in Lithuania
Schools in Ignalina